Mark S. White (December 12, 1851 – ?) was a teacher and politician in Florida. He lived in Pensacola and represented Escambia County, Florida in the Florida House of Representatives in 1883. He belonged to the Knights of Labor. He was described as "mulatto".

He was born in Montgomery, Alabama. He served as an election official.

See also
African-American officeholders during and following the Reconstruction era

References

Year of birth missing
Year of death unknown
People from Pensacola, Florida
Members of the Florida House of Representatives
African-American politicians during the Reconstruction Era